Grevillea longistyla is a species of flowering plant in the family Proteaceae and is endemic to Queensland in Australia. It is a shrub with divided leaves with linear lobes or simple, linear leaves, and groups of red to orange-red or bright pink flowers.

Description
The edges of the leaves are turned down or rolled under.

Taxonomy
Grevillea longistyla was first formally described in 1848 by William Jackson Hooker in Thomas Mitchell's Journal of an Expedition into the Interior of Tropical Australia. The specific epithet (longistyla) means "having a long style".

Distribution and habitat
This grevillea usually grows in woodland or forest and is found between Chinchilla, Gurulmundi and the Blackdown Tableland National Park in central and south-eastern Queensland.

Conservation status
Grevillea longistyla is listed as of "least concern" under the Queensland Government Nature Conservation Act 1992.

References

longistyla
Flora of Queensland
Proteales of Australia
Taxa named by William Jackson Hooker
Plants described in 1848